is a fictional Japanese detective created by Seishi Yokomizo, a renowned mystery novelist. His first case, The Honjin Murders, is a novel of locked room murder in an old family, which many people regard as one of the best Japanese detective novels, was published in 1946. Kindaichi went on to feature in another 76 novels, selling more than 55 million books and appearing in numerous television and stage adaptations.

Works in translation
Pushkin Vertigo has published English translations of the Kindaichi series since 2020. The Inugami Clan (1951) and The Honjin Murders (1946) were published in 2020, The Village of Eight Graves (1951) published in 2021, and Gokumon Island in June 2022.

One other novel is available in French translation.
 La Ritournelle du démon (original title: 悪魔の手まり歌　Akuma no Temari Uta) (1959)

Cases
The Kosuke Kindaichi series consists of 77 cases.

Bat and Slug (1947)
The Case of the Black Cat Restaurant (1947)
A Killer (1947–1932)
Black Orchid Princess (1948)

Death Mask (1949)

Mysterious Woman (1950)
Under Hundred Suns (1951)

A Crow (1951)

Dead Man's Seat (novel) (1952)
Lake of Mud (1953)
Undying Butterfly (1953)
Death Mask's Return (1953)
The Bride in the Labyrinth (1954)
Evil Man (1954)
Garden of Demon (1954)
Yurei Otoko (1954)
Fallen Angel (1954)
Mirage Island (novel) (1954)
The Sleeping Bride (1954)
Three Heads Tower (1955)
Vampire Moth (1955)
A Deadly Pond (1955)
Head (1955)
A Ghost in the Old Yard (1955)
The Poisoned Arrow (1956)
A Beautiful Waxwork (1956)
Black Wing (1956)
Death Angel's Arrow (1956)
A Calendar of Witch (1956)
A Cat in the Darkness (1956)
Lady in the Dream (1956)
The Seven Masks (1956)
Tragedy at the House of Meiro (1956)
Field of Beast (1956)
Head of a Playing Cards Table (1957)
Lady in the Mist (1957)
A Lady During the Wartime (1957)
Lady in the Mud (1957)
Lady in the Suitcase (1957)
Lady in the Mirror (1957)
Lady in the Umbrella (1957)
Lady in the Cell (1957)
Murder at the Kagami Beach (1957)
Mystery of the 13th Boat (1957)
A Devil's rhyme for playing ball (1957–1959)
Beautiful Lady in the Jar (1957)
Lady of the Fan (1957)
Girl's Shadow Under the Door (1957)
Demon's Birthday Festival (1958)
Lady in the Cave (1958)
Lady in the Coffin (1958)
Cross of Fire (1958)
Lady in the Red (1958)
Lady in the Pupil (1958)
Spade Queen (1958)
Rose Villa (1958)
A Demon Child (1958–1959)
Inside a Perfume's Mind (1958)
Villa in a Fog (1958)
Human Face (novel) (1960)
Female Leech (1960)
 Black and White (1960–1961)
One Hundred Lips Song of Satan (1962)
Lady in the Sundial (1962)
The End of Hunting (1962)
Black Tiger at Night (1963)
Cat Mansion (1963)
A Batman (1964)
A Masked Party (1974)

Demon's Island (1978–1980)

In popular culture

Director Kon Ichikawa made five films about Kindaichi, starring Koji Ishizaka:

The Inugami Family (1976)
Akuma no temari-uta (1977)
Gokumon-to (1977)
Rhyme of Vengeance (1978)
The House of Hanging on Hospital Slope  (1979)
The Inugamis (2006)

Director Nobuhiko Obayashi made a parody film in 1979 titled The Adventures of Kosuke Kindaichi

A profile of Kosuke appears at the end of the manga Case Closed Volume 6.

, the main character of Kindaichi Case Files, is depicted as the grandson of Kosuke Kindaichi.

In episode 14 of Lupin the Third Part II, a German count invites the best private detectives from all over the world - including Kindaichi - to the maiden voyage of his blimp in order to catch Lupin III, who is after the count's jewel.

In the Lupin the Third Part IV episode "From Japan With Love", the celebrity detective Akechi Kousuke Holmes is partially named after Kosuke Kindaichi (as well as Kogoro Akechi and Sherlock Holmes).

In 2013 and 2014 a pair of films were made pairing Kindaichi with another famous fictional Japanese detective Kogoro Akechi. Tomohisa Yamashita played Kindaichi, whilst Hideaki Itô was Akechi.

See also
 Kogoro Akechi

References

External links
 Kindaichi Kosuke Museum - Fans Site 

Fictional amateur detectives
Fictional Japanese people